The 2016 CONCACAF Futsal Championship was the 6th edition of the CONCACAF Futsal Championship, the quadrennial international futsal championship organised by CONCACAF for the men's national teams of the North, Central American and Caribbean region. The tournament was held in San José, Costa Rica between 8–14 May 2016. A total of eight teams played in the tournament.

Same as previous editions, the tournament acted as the CONCACAF qualifiers for the FIFA Futsal World Cup. The top four teams of the tournament qualified for the 2016 FIFA Futsal World Cup in Colombia as the CONCACAF representatives.

Champions Costa Rica, runners-up Panama, third-placed Guatemala and fourth-placed Cuba qualified for the 2016 FIFA Futsal World Cup as the CONCACAF representatives.

Qualification

The eight berths were allocated to the three regional zones as follows:
Two teams from the North American Zone (NAFU), including Mexico who qualified automatically
Three teams from the Central American Zone (UNCAF), including Costa Rica who qualified automatically as hosts
Two teams from the Caribbean Zone (CFU)
The final berth was allocated to the play-off winner between a team from the Central American Zone and a team from the Caribbean Zone

Regional qualification tournaments were held to determine the teams joining Mexico and hosts Costa Rica at the final tournament, including two play-offs which were played on 4 and 5 May in Costa Rica prior to the final tournament.

Qualified teams
The following eight teams qualified for the final tournament.

Venues
The matches were played at the BN Arena of Ciudad Deportiva de Hatillo in San José.

Draw
The draw for the tournament took place on 16 March 2016 at 12:30 CST (UTC−6) at the Hotel Barceló San José Palacio in San José.

The eight teams were drawn into two groups of four teams. Tournament host and defending CONCACAF Futsal Championship champion Costa Rica were seeded in Group B, while 2012 runner-up Guatemala were seeded in Group A.

The draw took place before the final two qualifiers from play-offs (Honduras and Canada) had been confirmed.

Squads

Each team could register a maximum of 14 players (two of whom must be goalkeepers).

Group stage
The top two teams of each group advanced to the semi-finals and qualified for the 2016 FIFA Futsal World Cup. The teams were ranked according to points (3 points for a win, 1 point for a draw, 0 points for a loss). If tied on points, tiebreakers would be applied in the following order:
Goal difference in all group matches;
Greatest number of goals scored in all group matches;
Greatest number of points obtained in the group matches between the teams concerned;
Goal difference resulting from the group matches between the teams concerned;
Greater number of goals scored in all group matches between the teams concerned;
Drawing of lots.

All times were local, CST (UTC−6).

Group A

Group B

Knockout stage
In the knockout stage, extra time and penalty shoot-out would be used to decide the winner if necessary.

Bracket

Semi-finals

Third place playoff

Final

Winners

Final ranking

Qualified teams for FIFA Futsal World Cup
The following four teams from CONCACAF qualified for the 2016 FIFA Futsal World Cup

1 Bold indicates champion for that year. Italic indicates host for that year.

Awards
The following awards were given at the conclusion of the tournament.

References

External links
Futsal, CONCACAF.com

2016
Concacaf
2016 in futsal
Futsal
International futsal competitions hosted by Costa Rica
2015–16 in Costa Rican football